The Aztec religion is a polytheistic and monistic pantheism in which the Nahua concept of  was construed as the supreme god , as well as a diverse pantheon of lesser gods and manifestations of nature. The popular religion tended to embrace the mythological and polytheistic aspects, and the Aztec Empire's state religion sponsored both the monism of the upper classes and the popular heterodoxies. 

The Aztec Empire officially recognized the most popular cults such that the deity was represented in the central temple precinct of the capital . The imperial cult was specifically that of the distinctive warlike patron god of the Mexica . Subjugated peoples were allowed to retain their own religious traditions in conquered provinces so long as they added the imperial god  to their local pantheons, while the Empire would often incorporate practices from its new territories into the mainstream religion.

In common with many other indigenous Mesoamerican civilizations, the Aztecs put great ritual emphasis on calendrics, and scheduled festivals, government ceremonies, and even war around key transition dates in the Aztec calendar. Public ritual practices could involve food, storytelling, and dance, as well as ceremonial warfare, the Mesoamerican ballgame, and human sacrifice. 

The cosmology of Aztec religion divides the world into thirteen heavens and nine earthly layers or netherworlds. The first heaven overlaps with the first terrestrial layer, so that heaven and the terrestrial layers meet at the surface of the Earth. Each level is associated with a specific set of deities and astronomical objects. The most important celestial entities in Aztec religion are the Sun, the Moon, and the planet Venus (as both "morning star" and "evening star").

Many leading deities of the Aztecs are worshiped in the contemporary or present-day world. These deities are known by names such as Tlaloc, Quetzalcoatl and Tezcatlipoca, who are venerated by different names in multiple cultures and have been throughout the history of Mesoamerica. For the Aztecs, deities of particular importance are the rain god Tlaloc; Huitzilopochtli, patron of the Mexica tribe; Quetzalcoatl, the feathered serpent and god of wind and learning; and Tezcatlipoca, the shrewd, elusive god of destiny and fortune. Tezcatlipoca was also connected to war and sorcery. Tlaloc and Huitzilopochtli were worshipped in shrines at the top of the largest pyramid (Templo Mayor) in the Aztec capital Tenochtitlan. A third monument in the plaza in front of Templo Mayor was devoted to the wind god, Ehecatl, who was an aspect or form of Quetzalcoatl.

Teotl
 
This is conceptualized in a kind of monistic pantheism as manifest in the supreme god , as well as a large pantheon of lesser gods and idealizations of natural phenomena such as stars and fire. Priests and educated upper classes held more monistic views, while the popular religion of the uneducated tended to embrace the polytheistic and mythological aspects. 

 is sometimes translated as "god", but it held more abstract aspects of divinity or supernatural energy, akin to the Polynesian concept of Mana.

In first contact with the Spanish prior to the conquest, emperor Moctezuma II and the Aztecs generally referred to Cortés and the conquistadors as "". Some historians interpret this to mean that the Aztecs believed them to be gods, but a better understanding of  suggests that they were being referred to as "mysterious" or "inexplicable".

Pantheon

The Aztecs would often adopt gods from different cultures and allow them to be worshiped as part of their pantheon. For example, the fertility god, Xipe Totec, was originally a god of the Yopi (the Nahuatl name of the Tlapanec people), but became an integrated part of the Aztec belief system. Further, sometimes foreign gods would be identified with an already existing god. Other deities, such as Tezcatlipoca and Quetzalcoatl, had roots in earlier civilizations of Mesoamerica, and were worshiped by many cultures under different names.

The many gods of the Aztecs can be grouped into complexes related to different themes. Some were associated with aspects of nature, such as Tlaloc and Quetzalcoatl, and other gods were associated with specific trades. Reflecting the complexity of ritual in Aztec society, there were deities related to pulque, a sacred alcoholic beverage, but also deities of drunkenness, excess, fun, and games.  Many gods had multiple aspects with different names, where each name highlighted a specific function or trait of the god. Occasionally, two distinct gods were conflated into one, and quite often, deities transformed into one another within a single story. Aztec images sometimes combined attributes of several divinities.

Aztec scholar H. B. Nicholson (1971) classed the gods into three groups according to their conceptual meaning in general Mesoamerican religion. The first group he called the "celestial creativity—divine paternalism group". The second: the Earth-mother gods, the pulque gods, and Xipe Totec. The third group, the War-Sacrifice-Sanguinary Nourishment group, contained such gods as Ometochtli, Huitzilopochtli, Mictlantecuhtli and Mixcoatl. A more specific classification based upon the functional attributes of the deities is as follows:

Cultural Gods
Tezcatlipoca: meaning "smoking mirror", a Pan-Mesoamerican shaman god, omnipotent universal power
Quetzalcoatl: meaning "feathered serpent", a Pan-Mesoamerican god of life, the wind and the morning star
Tlaloc: a Pan-Mesoamerican god of lighting, rain, water, and thunder
Mixcoatl: meaning "cloud serpent", the tribal god of many of the Nahua people such as the Tlaxcalteca, god of war, sacrifice and hunting
Huitzilopochtli: meaning "left-handed hummingbird", the patron god of the Mexica of Tenochtitlan, the sun

Nature gods
Metztli: the moon
Tlaltecuhtli: meaning "earth lord", goddess of the Earth
Chalchiuhtlicue: meaning "jade her skirt", goddess of springs
Centzon Huitznahua: meaning "the 400 southerners", gods of the stars
Ehecatl: the wind, often conflated with Quetzalcoatl and called "Quetzalcoatl-Ehecatl"

Gods of creation
Ōmeteōtl/Tōnacātēcuhtli: creator gods
Huehuetéotl/Xiuhtecuhtli: meaning "old god" and "turquoise lord", god of origin, time, fire and old age
Coatlicue/Toci/Teteoinnan/Tonantzin: progenitor goddesses

Gods of pulque and excess
Tlazolteotl: goddess of filth, guilt, and of cleansing
Tepoztecatl: god of pulque worshipped at Tepoztlan
Xochiquetzal: goddess of pleasure, indulgence, and sex
Mayahuel: goddess of pulque and maguey
The Ahuiateteo:
Macuiltochtli
Macuilxochitl
Macuil Cuetzpalin
Macuilcozcacuauhtli
Macuil Malinalli
Centzon Totochtin: meaning "the 400 rabbits", god of intoxication
Ometochtli: meaning "two rabbit", leader of the Centzon Totochtin, god of fertility and intoxication

Gods of maize and fertility
Xipe Totec: meaning "our flayed lord", fertility god associated with spring, patron god of goldsmiths
Centeotl: god of maize
Chicomecoatl: goddess of agriculture
Xilonen: goddes of tender maize
Xochipilli: meaning "flower prince", god of happiness, flowers, pleasure, and fertility

Gods of death and the underworld
Mictlantecuhtli: lord of the underworld
Mictlancihuatl: queen of the underworld
Xolotl: meaning "the animal", lord of the evening star

Trade gods
Yacatecuhtli: meaning "nose lord", god of merchants
Patecatl: god of doctors and medicine

Religion and society
Religion was part of all levels of Aztec society. On the state level, religion was controlled by the Tlatoani and the high priests governing the main temples in the ceremonial precinct of the Aztec capital of Tenochtitlan. This level involved the large monthly festivals and a number of specific rituals centered around the ruler dynasty and attempted to stabilize both the political and cosmic systems. These rituals were the ones that involved a sacrifice of humans. One of these rituals was the feast of Huey Tozoztli, when the ruler himself ascended Mount Tlaloc and engaged in autosacrifice in order to petition the rains. Throughout society, each level had their own rituals and deities and played their part in the larger rituals of the community. For example, the class of Pochteca merchants were involved in the feast Tlaxochimaco, where the merchant deity would be celebrated and slaves bought on specific slave markets by long-distance traders would be sacrificed. On the feast of Ochpaniztli all commoners participated in sweeping the streets. Afterwards, they also undertook ritual bathing. The most spectacular ritual was the New Fire ceremony which took place every 52 years and involved every citizen of the Aztec realm. During this, commoners would destroy house utensils, quench all fires, and receive new fire from the bonfire on top of Mt. Huixachtlan, lit on the chest of a sacrificed person by the high priests.
Women were also a vital part of Aztec society and religion. Many women had the right to land and the ability to vote on important issues. The Aztec deities also reflected this, as many of the essential deities were women.

Priests and temples
In the Nahuatl language, the word for priest was teopixqui - meaning "god guard". These men were seen as prominent leaders of the community who taught various ideas and morals to the public. Tlamacazqui the "giver of things" ensured that the gods were given their due in the form of offerings, ceremonies, and sacrifices.

The Tlatoani of Tenochtitlan was the head of the cult of Huitzilopochtli and of the state religion of the Aztec empire. He had special priestly duties in different rituals on the state level.

However, the Aztec religious organization was not entirely under his authority. Bernardino de Sahagún and Duran describe the pairs of high priests (quetzalcoatlus) who were in charge of the major pilgrimage centres (Cholula and Tenochtitlan) as enjoying immense respect from all levels of Aztec society—akin to archbishops—and a level of authority that partly transcended national boundaries. Under these religious heads were many tiers of priests, priestesses, novices, nuns, and monks (some part-time) who ran the cults of the various gods and goddesses. Sahagún reports that the priests had very strict training, and had to live very austere and ethical lives involving prolonged vigils, fasts, and penances. For instance, they often had to bleed themselves and undertake prescribed self-mortifications in the buildup to sacrificial rites.

Additionally, Sahagún refers to classes of religious specialists not affiliated with the established priesthood. This included wandering curers, black magicians, and other occultists (of which the Aztecs identified many types, most of which they feared) and hermits. Finally, the military orders, professions (e.g. traders (pochteca)) and wards (calpulli) each operated their own lodge dedicated to their specific god. The heads of these lodges, although not full-time religious specialists, had some ritual and moral duties. Duran also describes lodge members as having the responsibility of raising sufficient goods to host the festivals of their specific patron deity. This included annually obtaining and training a suitable slave or captive to represent and die as the image of their deity in that festival.

Aztec temples were basically offering mounds: solid pyramidal structures crammed with special soils, sacrifices, treasures and other offerings. Buildings around the base of the pyramid, and sometimes a small chamber under the pyramid, stored ritual items and provided lodgings and staging for priests, dancers, and temple orchestras. The pyramids were buried under a new surface every several years (especially every 52 years—the Aztec century). Thus the pyramid-temples of important deities constantly grew in size.

In front of every major temple lay a large plaza. This sometimes held important ritual platforms such as the "eagle stone" where some victims were slain. Plazas were where the bulk of worshippers gathered to watch rites and dances performed, to join in the songs and sacrifices (the audience often bled themselves during the rites), and to partake in any festival foods. Nobility sat on tiered seating under awnings around the plaza periphery, and some conducted part of the ceremonies on the temple.

Continual rebuilding enabled Tlatoani and other dignitaries to celebrate their achievements by dedicating new sculptures, monuments, and other renovations to the temples. For festivals, temple steps and tiers were also festooned with flowers, banners and other decorations. Each pyramid had a flat top to accommodate dancers and priests performing rites. Close to the temple steps there was usually a sacrificial slab and braziers.

The temple house (calli) itself was relatively small, although the more important ones had high and ornately carved internal ceilings. To maintain the sanctity of the gods, these temple houses were kept fairly dark and mysterious—a characteristic that was further enhanced by having their interiors swirling with smoke from copal (meaning incense) and the burning of offerings. Cortes and Diaz describe these sanctuaries as containing sacred images and relics of the gods, often bejeweled but shrouded under ritual clothes and other veils and hidden behind curtains hung with feathers and bells. Flowers and offerings (including a great amount of blood) generally covered much of the floors and walls near these images. Each image stood on a pedestal and occupied its own sanctuary. Larger temples also featured subsidiary chambers accommodating lesser deities.

In the ceremonial center of Tenochtitlan, the most important temple was the Great Temple which was a double pyramid with two temples on top. One was dedicated to Huitzilopochtli; this temple was called Coatepec (meaning "snake mountain"), and the other temple was dedicated to Tlaloc. Below the Tlatoani were the high priests of these two temples. Both high priests were called by the title Quetzalcoatl—the high priest of Huitzilopochtli was Quetzalcoatl Totec Tlamacazqui and the high priest of Tlaloc was Quetzalcoatl Tlaloc Tlamacazqui. Other important temples were located in the four divisions of the town. One example was the temple called Yopico in Moyotlan which was dedicated to Xipe Totec. Furthermore, all the calpullis had special temples dedicated to the patron gods of the calpulli. Priests were educated at the Calmecac if they were from noble families and in the Telpochcalli if they were commoners.

Cosmology and ritual

The Aztec world consisted of three main parts: the earth world on which humans lived (including Tamoanchan, the mythical origin of human beings), an underworld which belonged to the dead (called Mictlan, "place of death"), and the upper plane in the sky. The earth and the underworld were both open for humans to enter, whereas the upper plane in the sky was impenetrable to humans. Existence was envisioned as straddling the two worlds in a cycle of birth, life, death and rebirth. Thus as the sun was believed to dwell in the underworld at night to rise reborn in the morning and maize kernels were interred to later sprout anew, the human and divine existence was also envisioned as being cyclical. The upper and nether worlds were both thought to be layered. Mictlan had nine layers which were inhabited by different deities and mythical beings. The sky had thirteen layers, the highest of which was called Omeyocan ("place of duality") and served as the residence of the progenitor dual god Ometeotl. The lowest layer of the sky was a verdant spring-like place with abundant water called Tlalocan ("the place of Tlaloc").

After death, the soul of the Aztec went to one of three places: the sun, Mictlan, or Tlalocan. Souls of fallen warriors and women that died in childbirth would transform into hummingbirds that followed the sun on its journey through the sky. Souls of people who died from less glorious causes would go to Mictlan. Those who drowned would go to Tlalocan.
 
In Aztec cosmology, as in Mesoamerica in general, geographical features such as caves and mountains held symbolic value as places of crossing between the upper and nether worlds. The cardinal directions were symbolically connected to the religious layout of the world as well; each direction was associated with specific colors and gods.

To the Aztecs, death was instrumental in the perpetuation of creation, and gods and humans alike had the responsibility of sacrificing themselves in order to allow life to continue. This worldview is best described in the myth of the five suns recorded in the Codex Chimalpopoca, which recounts how Quetzalcoatl stole the bones of the previous generation in the underworld and how later the gods created four successive worlds or "suns" for their subjects to live in, all of which were destroyed. Then, by an act of self-sacrifice, one of the gods, Nanahuatzin ("the pimpled one"), caused a fifth and final sun to rise where the first humans, made out of maize dough, could live thanks to his sacrifice. Humans were responsible for the sun's continued revival. Blood sacrifice in various forms were conducted. Both humans and animals were sacrificed, depending on the god to be placated and the ceremony being conducted, and priests of some gods were sometimes required to provide their own blood through self-mutilation.
	
Sacrificial rituals among the Aztecs, and in Mesoamerica in general, must be seen in the context of religious cosmology: sacrifice and death was necessary for the continued existence of the world. Likewise, each part of life had one or more deities associated with it and these had to be paid their dues in order to achieve success. Gods were paid with sacrificial offerings of food, flowers, effigies, and quail. But the larger the effort required of the god, the greater the sacrifice had to be. Blood fed the gods and kept the sun from falling. For some of the most important rites, a priest would offer his own blood by cutting his ears, arms, tongue, thighs, chest, genitals, or offer a human life or a god's life. The people who were sacrificed came from many segments of society and might have been a war captive, slave, or a member of Aztec society; the sacrifice might also have been man or woman, adult or child, or noble or commoner.

Deity impersonation
An important aspect of Aztec ritual was the impersonation of deities. Priests or otherwise specially elected individuals would be dressed up to achieve the likeness of a specific deity. To honor the gods, various outfits and festivals were held. The Aztec deities served as providers for all of the society's needs. Along with various rituals and offerings, dressing up was thought as a way to respect the gods worshiped. A person with the honorable charge of impersonating a god was called ixiptla tli and was venerated as an actual physical manifestation of the god until the inevitable end when the god's likeness had to be killed as the ultimate sacrifice under great circumstance and festivities.

Reenactment of myth
As with the impersonation of gods, Aztec ritual was often a reenactment of a mythical event which at once served to remind the Aztecs of their religion, but it also served to perpetuate the world by repeating the important events of the creation.

Calendar

The Aztec religious year was connected mostly to the natural 365-day calendar, the xiuhpohualli ("yearcount"), which followed the agricultural year. Each of the 18 twenty-day months of the religious year had its particular religious festival—most of which were connected to agricultural themes. The greatest festival was the xiuhmolpilli, or New Fire ceremony, held every 52 years when the ritual and agricultural calendars coincided and a new cycle started. In the table below, the veintena festivals are shown, the deities with which they were associated and the kinds of rituals involved. The descriptions of the rites are based on the descriptions given in Sahagún's Primeros Memoriales, the Florentine Codex, and of Diego Durán's Of the Gods and Rites—all of which provide detailed accounts of the rituals written in Nahuatl soon after the conquest. 

When the Spaniards documented Aztec religious and ritual life, they provided abundant evidence that suggests that there existed a correspondence between the tropical year, the cycles of nature, and Aztec ceremonies. Given that such a relation existed, and that ritual functioned to reinforce it, scholars speculate that an unknown method must have been used to maintain the calendar in harmony with the solar year.

Mythology

The main deity in the Mexica religion was the sun god and war god, Huitzilopochtli. He directed the Mexicas to found a city on the site where they would see an eagle, devouring an animal (not all chronicles agree on what the eagle was devouring, one says it was a precious bird, and though Father Duran says it was a snake, this is not mentioned in any pre-Hispanic source), while perching on a fruit bearing nopal cactus. According to legend, Huitzilopochtli had to kill his nephew, Cópil, and throw his heart on the lake. But, since Cópil was his relative, Huitzilopochtli decided to honor him, and caused a cactus to grow over Cópil's heart which became a sacred place.

Legend has it that this is the site on which the Mexicas built their capital city of Tenochtitlan. Tenochtitlan was built on an island in the middle of Lake Texcoco, where modern-day Mexico City is located. This legendary vision is pictured on the Coat of Arms of Mexico.

According to their own history, when the Mexicas arrived in the Anahuac Valley around Lake Texcoco, they were considered by the other groups as the least civilized of all. The Mexicas decided to learn, and they took all they could from other peoples, especially from the ancient Toltec (whom they seem to have partially confused with the more ancient civilization of Teotihuacan). To the Mexicas, the Toltecs were the originators of all culture; toltecayotl was a synonym for culture. Mexica legends identify the Toltecs and the cult of Quetzalcoatl with the mythical city of Tollan, which they also identified with the more ancient Teotihuacan.

In the process, they adopted most of the Toltec/Nahua pantheon, but they also made significant changes in their religion. As the Mexica rose in power, they adopted the Nahua gods at equal status to their own. For instance, Tlaloc was the rain god of all the Nahuatl-speaking peoples. They put their local god Huitzilopochtli at the same level as the ancient Nahua god, and also replaced the Nahua Sun god with their own. Thus, Tlaloc/Huitzilopochtli represents the duality of water and fire, as evidenced by the twin pyramids uncovered near the Zocalo in Mexico City in the late 1970s, and it reminds us of the warrior ideals of the Aztec: the Aztec glyph of war is burning water.

Human sacrifice

Human sacrifice was practiced on a grand scale throughout the Aztec empire, although the exact figures were unknown. At Tenochtitlán, the principal Aztec city, "between 10,000 and 80,400 people" were sacrificed over the course of four days for the dedication of the Great Pyramid in 1487, according to Ross Hassig . Excavations of the offerings in the main temple has provided some insight in the process, but the dozens of remains excavated are far short of the thousands of sacrifices recorded by eyewitnesses and other historical accounts. For millennia, the practice of human sacrifice was widespread in Mesoamerican and South American cultures. It was a theme in the Olmec religion, which thrived between 1200 BCE and 400 BCE and among the Maya. Human sacrifice was a very complex ritual. Every sacrifice had to be meticulously planned from the type of victim to the specific ceremony needed for the god. The sacrificial victims were usually warriors but sometimes slaves, depending upon the god and needed ritual. The higher the rank of the warrior the better he is looked at as a sacrifice. The victim(s) would then take on the persona of the god he was to be sacrificed for. The victim(s) would be housed, fed, and dressed accordingly. This process could last up to a year. When the sacrificial day arrived, the victim(s) would participate in the specific ceremonies of the god. These ceremonies were used to exhaust the victim so that he would not struggle during the ceremony. Then five priests, known as the Tlenamacac, performed the sacrifice usually at the top of a pyramid. The victim would be laid upon the table, held down and subsequently have his heart cut out.

See also 
 Aztec philosophy
Aztec use of entheogens
Maya religion
 Mesoamerican mythology
Muisca religion
Santa Muerte (Mictecacihuatl reincarnate)

Notes

References 

Broda, Johanna. "Festivals and Festival Cycles." In  Carrasco David (ed). The Oxford Encyclopedia of Mesoamerican Cultures. : Oxford University Press, 2001.

External links

 Aztecs at Mexicolore: constantly updated educational site specifically on the Aztecs, for serious students of all ages

 
Aztec society
Mesoamerican mythology and religion
Religion in North America
Religion in Mexico
Polytheism